The Women's freestyle 53 kg wrestling competitions at the 2022 Commonwealth Games in Birmingham, England took place on 6 August at the Coventry Arena. A total of four competitors from four nations took part.

Results
The draw is as follows:

Nordic group

References

External link
 Results
 

Wrestling at the 2022 Commonwealth Games
2022 in women's sport wrestling